Snowdon station is a Montreal Metro station in the borough of Côte-des-Neiges–Notre-Dame-de-Grâce in Montreal, Quebec, Canada. It is operated by the Société de transport de Montréal (STM) and is a transfer station between the Orange Line and Blue Line; it is the western terminus of the Blue Line. It is located in the Snowdon neighbourhood. The town of Hampstead is located nearby to the west, across Macdonald Avenue; one emergency exit from the station extends into Hampstead.

The station opened on September 7, 1981 with service on the Orange Line only, though the Blue Line platforms were built at the same time. At the time it was the western terminus of the Orange Line, taking over from Place-Saint-Henri station; it is thus the only station to have been the terminus of two different lines. Service on the Blue Line began on January 4, 1988.

Overview
The station was constructed as an anti-directional cross-platform interchange, with three lateral tunnels containing two storeys each, joined by four cross-tunnels; both lines therefore have stacked platforms. This layout was intended to allow rapid transfer between a future extension into Notre-Dame-de-Grâce and service to downtown; this service never opened, and the station's layout means that most people who transfer between the Blue and Orange Lines must go down stairs.

The station's central access tunnel is connected at its western end to the station's single entrance, which is integrated into an STM control centre and contains a small sunken garden.

Architecture and art

The station was designed by Jean-Louis Beaulieu, who also provided sculptural grilles for the station's main staircase and the rear of the control building. The station's main artwork, a group of four murals by Claude Guité running the full length of the platform and entitled Les quatre saisons (the four seasons). The murals are painted on 500 panels of asbestos cement stretching the entire length of the platforms, they portray semi-abstract scenes of the foliage and weather associated with each of the four seasons. The seasons go in order, counterclockwise around the platforms, with winter on the Côte-Vertu platform, spring on Montmorency, summer on the Saint-Michel departure platform, and autumn on the Snowdon arrival platform.

Soon after the station opened the murals were victims of graffiti that badly damaged the artwork. Attempts of removing the graffiti destroyed large sections of the paintings. In 2004 the murals were all removed for a restoration plan by the STM to have the artist repaint the murals and slowly have them reinstalled in the station. As of June 2010 all the murals have been repainted, and are partially reinstalled on all four platforms of the station with a protective sheet of glass to prevent any future vandalism.

Starting October 2013 works were initiated on both levels of the station to build two interconnecting elevators to make the station accessible. Another, third elevator, was also constructed connecting the upper level with the surface entrance. The only vestibule of the station underwent reconstruction. After it was built, the surface elevator features its longest shaft in Montreal Metro, with the pit depth of about 25 meters. Works was completed by June 2016. However,  the only other accessible station on the Blue line is Jean-Talon station, which also interchanges with the Orange Line.

Origin of the name
This station is named for the neighborhood in which it is located, named in turn for the owner of a farm on which it was built.  The underground station platforms, located under Avenue Dornal, are approximately four blocks — about 250 m (270 yards) — east of the site of Snowdon Junction, a major transfer point during the streetcar era.

Connecting bus routes

Nearby points of interest
 Décarie Autoroute
 Saint Joseph's Oratory
 Côte-des-Neiges–Notre-Dame-de-Grâce borough hall
 Notre-Dame-de-Grâce Library
 Collège International Marie-de-France
 University of Montreal Geriatrics Institute
 Segal Centre for Performing Arts (formerly the Saidye Bronfman Centre)

References

External links

 Snowdon Station - official web page
 Snowdon metro station geo location
 Montreal by Metro, metrodemontreal.com
 2011 STM System Map
 Metro Map

Accessible Montreal Metro stations
Orange Line (Montreal Metro)
Blue Line (Montreal Metro)
Railway stations in Canada opened in 1981
Côte-des-Neiges–Notre-Dame-de-Grâce
1981 establishments in Quebec